Nonstop was a Portuguese girl band, created out of the TV reality-competition show Popstars, in 2001. Nonstop have achieved notable success with their first album, Nonstop, and especially with their first hit single, "Ao Limite Eu Vou".

Songwriter and producer Eliot Kennedy - who had previously worked with bands such as Spice Girls and Take That - once said "they are probably the best group I have worked with. Their voices are so good!"

Formation
In 2001 the dream catcher reality-show Popstars was launched in Portugal by the television station SIC with the aim of creating a five-piece girl band.

Over twelve hundred girls attended auditions held in Porto, the Algarve and Lisbon, hoping for a place in the group.

During auditions in the Algarve, Liliana Almeida saw her participation be denied due to age restrictions - she was only 17. Almeida would eventually make it to the last day of auditions in Lisbon, which coincided with her 18th birthday.

By 4 April 2001, the five finalists had been chosen: Andrea Soares, Ana Rita Reis, Fátima Sousa, Kátia Moreira, and Liliana Almeida were to become Portugal's Popstars. Nonstop was born.

Subsequent career
Nonstop's first single, "Ao Limite Eu Vou" was produced by the Steelworks producing team; Tim Woodcock and Eliot Kennedy. The song became one of the biggest hits of that summer, going #1 on the national music charts, easily reaching gold status.

Also produced by Steelworks, Nonstop's self-titled debut album was released on July 16, 2001. The album sold over 30,000 copies and went gold.

Along with their success in Portugal, there was interest for their music in other countries in their music, such as Canada, Belgium, and South Africa.

This same interest brought back to Portugal the Steelworks duo, so that some of the album songs could be recorded in their English versions.

Meanwhile, "Basta Um Sorriso" was chosen to be the girl band’s second single and became the group's second hit. Miguel Gaudêncio, who had directed the band's first music video, was planning to make the first ever Portuguese 3D music video for "Basta Um Sorriso", but it was never finished. Some sponsors cut the funds, the record company also did not back up the music video, which did not help the situation.

Six months after the group's formation, in January, 2002, Fátima announced she was leaving the band, justifying her departure for being homesick. Despite the loss of one member, the four remaining girls decided to continue as a quartet.

Nonstop's promotion for their first album continued with the release of its third single, "Não Há Nada Em Mim", and the constantly appeared on various TV shows and in magazines (not to mention their daily updated website). Also, the song "Olhar P'ra Ti (Só Para Ti)" was chosen to become part of the original soundtrack of the Portuguese telenovela Fúria de Viver, which increased the group's popularity. They also participated, as special guests, in the Portuguese teen series Uma Aventura....

While touring Portugal from north to south, the band—along with its management, NZ Produções—decided to bring in something new to their concerts. This took the girls back to studio recording to do a cover of the Patti LaBelle version of "Lady Marmalade".

Afterwards, Nonstop broke with NZ Produções and joined Lemon.

Then, in 2004, three years after releasing their debut album, Nonstop announced their comeback.

Their second album, entitled "Tudo Vai Mudar", named after its first single "E Tudo Vai Mudar", was released on May 5 of that year. As with "Nonstop", "Tudo Vai Mudar" also featured the production and songwriting work of Steelworks. National producers as AC Firmino and Augusto Armada (better known as Boss AC and Gutto); Carlos Juvantes and Gonçalo Pereira also gave their contribution to the album.

The album's promotion started much before its release. "E Tudo Vai Mudar" was very well received by the media, being strongly promoted by the national radios and MTV Portugal.

Nonstop also attended various TV Shows, usually singing live. They also guest-starred on national TV’s prime time series leader, "Inspector Max".

The girls' fifth single, "Play-back", a cover of Carlos Paião's hit in the 80s, was released on July 17, 2004 premiering on SIC's Sunday primetime talk-show, "HermanSIC", where the girls, after participating in a little comedy sketch with the show’s host, once again, performed live.

The "Tudo Vai Mudar Tour" took the girls travelling to countries such as Canada and France. Nonstop was also the band chosen to open ex-Boyzone’s Ronan Keating concert in Portugal.

Then, in 2005, Rita Reis was featured in two albums: Boss AC’s Ritmo, Amor e Palavras, in the song "És mais que uma mulher"; and in Gutto’s Chokolate, the duet Importante. Rita, Andrea and Liliana also made an appearance on Gutto’s video for Só Quero Dançar ("I Just Want To Dance").

Later that month, Nonstop were invited to do a cover of Boney M's, Daddy Cool for RTP’s contest special, for 19 March (father’s day); Um, Dois, Três (1, 2, 3) ’.

Later that year, in April, Nonstop celebrated their fourth anniversary with a private party in one of Lisbon's most famous pubs, W. The party was later reported on SIC’s, Extâse.

Still in 2005, Nonstop started to promote the ballad; "Assim Como És", produced by AC and Gutto, and E Tudo Vai Mudar’s English, and original version Sooner Or Later.

With the start of the New Year, 2006 also became the start of a new era for Nonstop.

Invited by the Portuguese song producer, Elvis Veiguinha, to participate in RTP’s Song Festival Contest 2006, Nonstop jumped back into studio to record Coisas de Nada, originally entitled Vem Dançar.

RTP’s Song Festival Contest 2006 took place on 10 March – Liliana’s birthday – at Lisbon’s Centro de Congressos. After a tie with Vânia Oliveira’s song, Sei Quem Sou (Portugal), the jury decided that Coisas de Nada would represent Portugal at the Eurovision Song Contest 2006 semi-final in Athens, making Nonstop the official winners of 2006 national contest. However, Nonstop failed to make the final of the contest, coming in 19th place in the semi-finals.  They also won the Barbara Dex Award that year for the worst-dressed act.

In February 2007, a collaboration between Portuguese rapper Gutto and group member Liliana has been released. Deixa Ferver receives heavy rotation on MTV Portugal and radio stations.

Discography

Albums

Singles

Featured singles

Music videos

References

External links
 

Portuguese girl groups
Eurovision Song Contest entrants for Portugal
Eurovision Song Contest entrants of 2006
Popstars winners
Portuguese musicians